Geri Antoinette Allen (June 12, 1957 – June 27, 2017) was an American jazz pianist, composer, and educator. In addition to her career as a performer and bandleader, Allen was also an associate professor of music at the University of Pittsburgh and the director of the university's Jazz Studies program.

Early life and education
Allen was born in Pontiac, Michigan, on June 12, 1957, and grew up in Detroit. "Her father, Mount Allen Jr, was a school principal, her mother, Barbara, a government administrator in the defence industry." Allen was educated in Detroit Public Schools. She started playing the piano at the age of seven, and settled on becoming a jazz pianist in her early teens.

Allen graduated from Howard University's jazz studies program in 1979. She then continued her studies: with pianist Kenny Barron in New York; and at the University of Pittsburgh, where she completed a master's degree in ethnomusicology in 1982. After this, she returned to New York.

Later life and career

Allen became involved in the M-Base collective in New York. Her recording debut as a leader was in 1984, resulting in The Printmakers. This trio album, with bassist Anthony Cox and drummer Andrew Cyrille, also featured some of Allen's compositions.

Allen married trumpeter Wallace Roney in 1995. They had a daughter and a son; the marriage ended in divorce. Allen was awarded the Jazzpar Prize in 1996. In the same year, she recorded two albums with Ornette Coleman: Sound Museum: Hidden Man and Sound Museum: Three Women.

In 2006, Allen composed "For the Healing of the Nations", a suite written in tribute to the victims and survivors of the September 11 attacks. She was awarded a Guggenheim Fellowship in 2008.

Allen was a longtime resident of Montclair, New Jersey. She became director of the jazz studies program at the University of Pittsburgh in 2013.

Allen died on June 27, 2017, two weeks after her 60th birthday, in Philadelphia, Pennsylvania, after suffering from cancer.

Awards 

 Honorary Doctorate of Music from Berklee, 2014
 Guggenheim Fellowship, 2008
 African American Classical Music Award from Spelman College, 2007 
 The Benny Golson Jazz Master Award, 2005
 Distinguished Alumni Award from Howard, 1996
 Danish Jazzpar Prize (first woman recipient), 1996 
 Soul Trains Lady of Soul Award (first recipient) for jazz album of the year for Twenty-One, 1995 Discography 

As leader/co-leader
Main sources:"Geri Allen Discography", JazzDisco.org. Retrieved November 22, 2017.

 As sidewoman 
Main source:

With Franco Ambrosetti
 Movies (Enja, 1987)
 Movies Too (Enja, 1988)

With Betty Carter
 Droppin' Things (Verve, 1993)
 Feed the Fire (Verve, 1993)

With Ornette Coleman
 Sound Museum: Hidden Man (Harmolodic/Verve, 1996)
 Sound Museum: Three Women (Harmolodic/Verve, 1996)

With Steve Coleman
 Motherland Pulse (JMT, 1985)
 And Five Elements: On the Edge of Tomorrow (JMT, 1986)
 And Five Elements: World Expansion (JMT, 1986)
 And Five Elements: Sine Die (Pangaea, 1986) – 1 track

With Charlie Haden 
 1987: Etudes (Soul Note, 1988)
 1989: The Montreal Tapes: with Geri Allen and Paul Motian (Verve, 1997)
 1989: The Montreal Tapes: Liberation Music Orchestra (Verve, 1999)

With Oliver Lake
 Expandable Language (Black Saint, 1984)
 Otherside (Gramavision, 1988)
 Talkin' Stick (Passin' Thru, 2000)

With Charles Lloyd
 Lift Every Voice (ECM, 2002)
 Jumping the Creek (ECM, 2004)

With Wallace Roney
 Munchin' (Muse, 1993)
 Crunchin' (Muse, 1993)
 Mistérios (Warner Bros., 1994) 
 Village (Warner Bros, 1997)
 No Room for Argument (Stretch, 2000)
 Prototype (HighNote, 2004)
 Mystikal (HighNote, 2005)
 Jazz (Highnote, 2007)

With Trio 3 (Oliver Lake, Reggie Workman & Andrew Cyrille)
 At This Time (Intakt, 2009)
 Celebrating Mary Lou Williams–Live at Birdland New York (Intakt, 2011)With others'''
 Cecil Brooks III, The Collective (Muse, 1989)
 Roy Brooks, Duet in Detroit (Enja, 1993) – rec. 1989
 Buddy Collette, Flute Talk with James Newton (Soul Note, 1988)
 Craig Handy, Reflections in Change (Sirocco Music, 1999)
 Frank Lowe, Decision in Paradise (Soul Note, 1984)
 Paul Motian, Monk in Motian (JMT, 1988)
 Greg Osby, Mindgames (JMT, 1988)
 Dewey Redman, Living on the Edge (Black Saint, 1989)
 Gregory Charles Royal, Dream Come True (GCR, 1979) – reissued (Celeste (Japan), 2008)
 Woody Shaw, Bemsha Swing (Blue Note, 1997) – rec. 1986
 John Stubblefield, Bushman Song (Enja, 1986)
 Gary Thomas, By Any Means Necessary (JMT, 1989)
 Ernie Watts, Unity (JVC, 1995)
 The Mary Lou Williams Collective, Zodiac Suite: Revisited (Mary, 2006)
 Buster Williams, Houdini (Sirocco Music, 2001) – rec. 2000
 Reggie Workman, Cerebral Caverns (Postcards, 1995)
 V.A., Kansas City (A Robert Altman Film, Original Motion Picture Soundtrack) (Verve, 1996)

Filmography
Geri Allen portrays jazz pianist Mary Lou Williams and performs with the jazz band in the Robert Altman film Kansas City''.

See also 
 List of jazz pianists
 The Detroit Experiment

References

External links
 Official Website 4
 Geri Allen at Motéma Music
 Geri Allen at All About Jazz
 Geri Allen at NPR Music
 Jazz Conversations with Eric Jackson: Geri Allen, from WGBH Radio Boston
 Geri Allen at Rhapsody

1957 births
2017 deaths
African-American jazz pianists
African-American record producers
American women jazz musicians
American jazz composers
Women jazz composers
American jazz educators
Cass Technical High School alumni
Deaths from cancer in Pennsylvania
Howard University alumni
Musicians from Detroit
Jazz musicians from New Jersey
Musicians from Pittsburgh
Musicians from Pontiac, Michigan
People from Montclair, New Jersey
Post-bop jazz musicians
University of Pittsburgh alumni
University of Pittsburgh faculty
Women jazz pianists
University of Michigan faculty
Jazz musicians from Michigan
Jazz musicians from Pennsylvania
Women music educators
Motéma Music artists
American women academics
African-American women musicians
20th-century African-American people
21st-century African-American people
20th-century African-American women
21st-century African-American women